Engyprosopon xenandrus is a species of flatfish in the family Bothidae.

References 

Bothidae
Animals described in 1905